Conversions: A K&D Selection is a DJ mix album, mixed by Kruder & Dorfmeister. It was released on 16 February 1996 on Shadow Records.

Track listing
 "Dat's Cool" - DJ Unknown Face – 6:15
 "Searchin'" - Dead Calm – 7:44
 "Come On (Simon Templar Remix)" - The Ballistic Brothers – 4:58
 "Nu Birth of Cool" - Omni Trio – 5:45
 "One and Only" - PFM – 9:20
 "Find Me" - Skanna – 4:49
 "Speechless Drum & Bass" - Count Basic – 6:50
 "Visible From Space (Aquasky Remix)" - Hunch – 5:53
 "Time Zone" - Space Link – 5:29
 "The Lick" - Earl Grey – 6:33

References

Kruder & Dorfmeister albums
DJ mix albums
1996 compilation albums